A Town Like Alice is a 1950 novel by British author Nevil Shute.

Other works based on the novel:
A Town Like Alice (film), a 1956 film, also known as Rape of Malaya in U.S. cinemas
A Town Like Alice (miniseries), a 1981 Australian mini-series, produced by the Seven Network
A Town Like Alice (song) composed by Letty Katts, inspired by the book, not used in the film